is a platform, action role-playing dungeon crawl game developed by Namco and released in 1984. It runs on Namco Pac-Land hardware, modified to support vertical scrolling. In Japan, the game was ported to the Family Computer (Famicom), MSX, and X68000; the latter version was later released for the Virtual Console in the same region on November 18, 2008. Dragon Buster has been ported for the PSP and is available as part of Namco Museum Battle Collection. It was followed by a Japan-only Famicom sequel, Dragon Buster II: Yami no Fūin, and was later followed by the PlayStation game Dragon Valor, which was both a remake and sequel.

The game has side-scrolling platform gameplay and an overworld map similar to the later platform games for home consoles and personal computers. Dragon Buster was also the earliest game to feature a double jump mechanic, and one of the first to use a visual health meter.

Plot
In the beginning, a prince named Clovis was born the son of the kingdom's chief bodyguard to the royal Lawrence family. As a young child, Clovis was very mischievous and undisciplined, so his father thought it might be best to place him under the care of a monk who lived in the woods far from the kingdom. Under the monk's care, Clovis began to learn various aspects of knowledge, including how to be a superior swordsman. When word reached the monk that King Lawrence's 16-year-old daughter Celia had been abducted and held by a fearsome dragon, who wished to break the kingdom's spirit and coerce the kingdom to do his bidding, Clovis felt a sense of duty to chase after the dragon and rescue Celia in the name of his father. In order to save the Princess, he trained daily with the monk and learned to withstand injury, whether cut by swords or burned by the flame and still be just as capable a fighter as ever.

Gameplay

The player must guide the hero Clovis through each round on to the castle to rescue his beloved Princess Celia. There are multiple Princess Celias in the game, one in every few castles. The goal is to reach the true Celia at the end of the game in the final castle. Celia wears a different outfit each time she is rescued. As the player progresses through the round, he or she must choose various paths to take on to the castle. There are many paths to choose from and the number of these increases as the player gets to the higher rounds. The paths take the player to the individual levels of the round. There are multiple bosses on each level and many less powerful enemies scattered throughout each level. The player must find the boss that contains the exit on each level to proceed through the round and finally reach the castle. Clovis's vitality restores itself by 25% after each level is completed. The game ends when Clovis' vitality reaches zero.

There are five different types of levels: The Cave, The Tower, The Boneyard, The Mountain and The Ruins. Each of these levels boasts more of a particular type of monster than the others. For example, The Boneyard contains more of the boss Skeleton. The Cave is a mostly linear type of level, with mostly descents and horizontal movement. It boasts many bats and snakes. The Tower is notable for having many floors, and the player must do a lot of climbing in this type of level. The Boneyard is probably the most difficult type of level for having many enemies and paths to choose, and the player will most likely end up defeating every boss in the level before finding the boss that contains the exit. The Mountain has the player descend from the top of the mountain. The Ruins is a standard type of level with a bit of everything the other four types of levels contain. Finally, there is the Castle at the end of each round. Every Castle is the same, starting with a very long drop that takes the player to the Dragon's room to fight the Dragon.

Ports
When the game was ported to the NEC PC-8801 computer by Enix, the port featured an introduction to the game and an entirely new ending, featuring cinema screens depicting a battle-torn Clovis and a teary-eyed Celia.
Dragon Buster was also included as a hidden mini-game in Tales of the Abyss for PlayStation 2 and Nintendo 3DS. It was included in various Namco Museum compilations including Namco Museum Volume 2 for the original PlayStation, Namco Museum Battle Collection for PlayStation Portable, and Namco Museum Virtual Arcade for Xbox 360. On December 9, 2021, Hamster announced that the emulated version is scheduled to be released for the Nintendo Switch and PlayStation 4 as part of the Arcade Archives line of digital releases.

Reception
Dragon Buster was a hit in Japan, where Game Machine listed it on their March 1, 1985 issue as being the third most-successful table arcade unit of the month. Computer + Video Games liked the game's ease to newcomers and colorful graphics, saying it stood out from other arcade games at the time.

Notes

References

External links
 

Role-playing video games
1984 video games
1985 video games
Arcade video games
Bandai Namco Entertainment franchises
Video games about dragons
Fantasy video games
FM-7 games
MSX2 games
Namco arcade games
NEC PC-8801 games
NEC PC-9801 games
Nintendo Entertainment System games
Nintendo Switch games
PlayStation 4 games
Sharp X1 games
X68000 games
Side-scrolling role-playing video games
Video games developed in Japan
Video games scored by Yuriko Keino
Video games set in castles
Virtual Console games
Virtual Console games for Wii U
Action role-playing video games
Platform games
Dungeon crawler video games
Single-player video games
Tose (company) games
Enix games
Hamster Corporation games